A Touch of Home: The Vietnam War's Red Cross Girls is an American documentary film produced and directed by Patrick and Cheryl Fries.  The film tells the story of 627 young American women who served in the American Red Cross Supplemental Recreation Overseas Program during the Vietnam War.  It was screened in Dallas, Texas on April 21, 2007.

Subject matter 

The Vietnam War Red Cross "Donut Dollies" were young, college-degreed women who spent a one-year tour in country as morale boosters for American troops.  They ran recreation centers, visited hospitals, and, because of the mobility of the UH-1 Iroquois helicopter, traveled to front-line landing zones and base camps to bring games and smiles to soldiers.  Many chose to join the program because of President John F. Kennedy, who encouraged young people to serve the country.

Content

The film producers expanded on a brief segment about Vietnam Donut Dollies in their previous production In the Shadow of the Blade with A Touch of Home.  The film includes interviews with veterans of the program and follows them as they reflect on their experience during a reunion at the Vietnam Veterans Memorial State Park in Angel Fire, New Mexico.  Much of the documentary includes unique wartime photographs and home movies captured by the Donut Dollies during their tours.

Awards and recognitions

The documentary won Best Short Documentary in the 2009 GI Film Festival.

References

External links
 Review in Arts of War on the Web, July 8, 2009
 Film website

History of women in the United States
Documentary films about the Vietnam War
American documentary films
Documentary films about women in war
American Red Cross
American women in the Vietnam War
Women in warfare post-1945
2000s American films